The A-B Helicopters A/W 95 is an American helicopter, produced by A-B Helicopters in the form of plans for amateur construction.

By 2012 the A-B Helicopters website had been taken down and plans are no longer available.

The design was developed into the Vortech A/W 95 and plans for that version remain available from Vortech.

Design and development
The A/W 95 is a development of the Adams-Wilson Choppy, which the A/W designation acknowledges. It features a single main rotor, a single-seat open cockpit without a windshield, skid landing gear and a twin cylinder, air-cooled, two-stroke, dual-ignition  Rotax 503 engine.

The aircraft fuselage is an open frame made from bolted-together and gusseted aluminum tubing. The transmission is constructed from a belt and chain mechanism.

While the A/W 95 is primarily plans-built, during the time that A-B Helicopters was in business some pre-fabricated parts were available.

Operational history
By January 2013 two examples had been registered in the United States with the Federal Aviation Administration.

Specifications (A/W 95)

See also
Showers Skytwister Choppy
Vortech A/W 95

References

External links
Photo of an A/W 95 in flight

1990s United States sport aircraft
1990s United States helicopters
Homebuilt aircraft
Single-engined piston helicopters
AW95